Detective Chief Superintendent Jim Strange  is a fictional character in the television series Inspector Morse, played by James Grout. The character also appears, as a Police Constable and Detective Sergeant, in the prequel series Endeavour, portrayed by Sean Rigby. Although Strange does not appear in every episode of Inspector Morse, he is present in the whole series (of 33 2-hour TV films) from beginning to end. The intervening episodes from which he is absent are few in number.  Strange's first name is never revealed in the Inspector Morse series.

In the episode “Twighlight of the Gods” Strange is seen wearing a miniature form of the OBE medal on his suit, indicating he is the holder of the national honour.

Portrayal
Strange was played by British actor James Grout (1927–2012), with Grout's BBC obituary stating it was the best-known character he had played. In the subsequent prequel series Endeavour, Strange is played by Sean Rigby. Here the character is a uniformed Police Constable, working alongside the young Detective Constable Morse. PC Jim Strange interacts with the young Morse in a number of ways which point to the origins of later aspects of their relationship in the Inspector Morse series.

Character

Numerous photographs, plaques, and model ships seen in the background of his office as Chief Superintendent suggest prior service with the Royal Navy Submarine Service. As a young Constable in Endeavour Strange is already in the habit of addressing people as "matey". Slightly overweight, and given to bouts of pomposity, he is nonetheless a dependable and honest policeman, with his mind set on a career in the police. During the second series of Endeavour, Strange is invited to become a Freemason and accepts. During the third series, set in 1967, he is promoted to Sergeant and subsequently moves from uniform to the Criminal Investigation Department as Morse's immediate superior.  Morse questions whether Strange's involvement with Freemasonry may be behind his promotion, and Strange admits that this may be so, although unlike Morse he sees nothing wrong with this, saying that you have to "play the game" to get ahead.

By the chronologically later stage of the (earlier) Inspector Morse series, Strange, holding the rank of Chief Superintendent, is the Divisional Commander for Oxford, of the Thames Valley Police force. His relationship with the principal character, Morse, is at times turbulent. Strange is a traditionalist, a Freemason, and a stickler for rules and regulations. Morse is also a traditionalist, but not in the same conservative sense as Strange; likewise, Morse is not interested in Freemasonry, although he proves knowledgeable on the subject, and in the 15th episode Masonic Mysteries proves his knowledge from the sublime (deep symbolism of masonry) to the less so (revealing to a junior traffic cop that he knows the masonic handshake, and that he is fully aware of which members of the local police are in the lodge); it is certainly true that the rules and regulations often frustrate Morse, and this leads to disagreements with Strange – a theme also picked up by the prequel, which shows the two characters disagreeing over the importance of rules in series 1, episode 1.

However, it is also clear that Strange has a deep respect for Morse, even if not always appreciating his methods. Despite often addressing Morse, somewhat dismissively, as "matey", a clear mutual respect eventually shines through their relationship – in the final episode, The Remorseful Day, in which Morse dies, Strange's attitude towards Morse might even be described as fond and affectionate. This is even more apparent in the original novel in which Morse is shown to have acted to prevent a potential embarrassment for Strange. The "matey" form of address is explained in the prequel as a common form of address by Strange for all his acquaintances.

Chief Superintendent Strange also shows a clear respect for and of Sergeant Lewis, Morse's loyal assistant, sometimes consulting him directly, and occasionally even (as in Dead on Time) approving his ideas without reference to Morse. Ultimately Strange  gives Lewis strong encouragement to seek promotion to Detective Inspector, as indeed he had encouraged him earlier in the series to apply for a vacant Inspector's position in the Oxford traffic police. However, the character does not appear in the sequel series Lewis, in the timeline of which, he appears to have retired.

Notes

References

Fictional British police detectives
Inspector Morse
Television characters introduced in 1987